The Coal Industry Commission Act 1919 (c 1) was an Act of Parliament of the United Kingdom, which set up a commission, led by Mr Justice Sankey (and so known as the "Sankey Commission"), to consider joint management or nationalisation of the coal mines. It also considered the issues of working conditions, wage and hours.

Background
A Royal Commission, led by Sir John Sankey, was called to examine the future of the mining industry. Leo Chiozza Money, Sidney Webb and R.H. Tawney were the three economists on the commission, all broadly favourable to the miners. Others were appointed from business and the trade unions.

The commission offered compromises on wages and hours, and also recommended nationalisation. The government rejected the report. No agreement was reached and, when the commission reported in June 1919, it offered four separate approaches ranging from full nationalisation to continued private ownership. The government cited this disagreement as a reason to reject nationalisation.

The public impact of the report was such that, in Ben Travers' comic novel A Cuckoo in the Nest (1921), the Rev. Cathcart Sloley-Jones, under the illusion that he was addressing a Member of Parliament, "lowered his voice into a rather sinister whisper: 'What is Lloyd George's real view of the miners' report?'"

Commissioners
Mr Justice Sankey, chairman recommended modified nationalisation 
Frank Hodges, recommended nationalisation
Leo Chiozza Money
Robert Smillie
Herbert Smith
R. H. Tawney
Sidney Webb
Arthur Balfour, favoured minor reforms
R. W. Cooper
Sir Adam Nimmo
Sir Allan M Smith
Sir Evan Williams
Sir Arthur Duckham, recommended reorganisation under private ownership

See also
UK labour law
UK public service law

Notes

References
AJP Taylor The Oxford History of England: English History 1914-1945 (1965)

External links
 Coal Industry Commission Reports and Minutes of Evidence of the First Stage of the Enquiry
 Coal Industry Commission Reports and Minutes of Evidence of the Second Stage of the Enquiry

United Kingdom labour law
United Kingdom Acts of Parliament 1919
1919 in labor relations
Coal in the United Kingdom
Coal industry